One Kiss may refer to:

 One Kiss (film), a 2016 film directed by Ivan Cotroneo
 One Kiss (album), a 2006 album by Prairie Oyster
 "One Kiss" (song), a 2018 song by Calvin Harris and Dua Lipa
 "One Kiss", a song by Eddie Cochran from the 1957 album Singin' to My Baby
 "One Kiss", song from the 1928 operetta The New Moon and two film versions: New Moon (1930) New Moon (1940)